Jen Silverman is an American playwright, TV writer, and novelist.

Silverman grew up living and traveling in Scandinavia, Asia, and Europe as well as the United States. They completed a BA in comparative literature at Brown University and an MFA in playwriting at the University of Iowa, and also studied at Juilliard. They are the author of the book The Island Dwellers, an interlinked story collection published by Random House.

Background 
They have taught theatre and playwriting classes at the University of Iowa, Playwrights Horizons Theater School at New York University, and ESPA (at Primary Stages). Silverman completed residencies at MacDowell Colony (two-time fellow), New Harmony, Hedgebrook, the Millay Colony for the Arts, and SPACE on Ryder Farm. Silverman also writes for TV; they wrote for Netflix's Tales of the City (2019 miniseries).

Works

Plays 

Collective Rage: A Play In 5 Betties; In Essence, A Queer And Occasionally Hazardous Exploration; Do You Remember When You Were In Middle School And You Read About Shackleton And How He Explored The Antarctic?; Imagine The Antarctic As A Pussy And It’s Sort Of Like That 
The Moors
Phoebe In Winter
Pirates of the Cafeteria
The Roommate
Still
Wink
 Witch

Other works 

 The Island Dwellers: Stories (2018)

Awards 
Silverman has received the Yale Drama Series Award, Lilly Award, Kennedy Center's Paula Vogel Playwriting Award, MacDowell Fellow,  the Helen Merrill Fund Award in 2015, and the PoNY Fellowship (2016-2017).

References 

Year of birth missing (living people)
Living people
American women dramatists and playwrights
21st-century American dramatists and playwrights
21st-century American women writers
Brown University alumni
University of Iowa alumni
Juilliard School alumni
University of Iowa faculty
MacDowell Colony fellows
American women academics